Foreign relations of Pope Pius XII extended to most of Europe and a few states outside Europe. Pius XII was pope from 1939 to 1958, during World War II and the beginning of the Cold War.

Background 

Between the loss of the Papal States in 1870 and the signing of the Lateran Treaty in 1929, the diplomatic recognition of the papacy had actually increased, with eighteen accredited members of the Vatican diplomatic corps in 1890, fourteen in 1914, and twenty-four in 1921. This did not represent international support for the papal position in the Roman Question, however, as these nations also recognized the unified Kingdom of Italy, whose diplomatic corps in Rome developed over a similar trajectory.

In 1936 (three years before Pius XII became pope), there were thirty-four ambassadors, ministers, or chargé d'affaires to the Holy See. However, several of these diplomats spent much of their time in other European capitals—either for personal reasons or because they served multiple embassies (Argentina, Estonian, Latvia, Liberia, Peru, and El Salvador), were merely sinecures (Belgium), or were unpaid (Honduras). Others represented micronations that "hardly counted" (Monaco, San Marino, and the Order of Malta). The Spanish ambassador was driven out by a "tragi-comic siege" in the Piazza di Spagna. Nicaragua's ambassador was senile, and Panama's ambassador had not been seen since 1929.

In March 1939, Pius XII inherited thirty-eight diplomatic missions to the Vatican: thirteen at the "ambassadorial level", and the rest at the ministerial level; there were also papal representatives in thirty-eight countries, but the exchanges were not always mutual. At the time there were also twenty-three Vatican envoys without diplomatic status in their host state.

In contrast to the various sinecures, Diego von Bergen was a high-ranking member of the German diplomatic service, who twice turned down the office of Foreign Secretary to remain in Rome. According to Morley, "when Pius XII became Pope, there were papal nuncios in, among other capitals, Belgrade, Berlin, Berne, Brussels, Bucharest, Budapest, the Hague, Paris, Prague, Rome, and Warsaw. The circumstances of war reduced this number and changed the location and level of some of the diplomatic representatives. The end-result of these modifications was that during the years 1939-1943, the Secretariat of State was in diplomatic contact with its emissaries in Berlin, Rome, Vichy, Berne, Bratislava, Zagreb, Bucharest, and Budapest. In addition, active communications were maintained with the apostolic delegates in London, Washington, and Ankara".

List of diplomats
A list of diplomats accredited to the Vatican published in December 1940 lists Diego von Bergen as the dean of the diplomatic corps, followed by thirteen Ambassadors and twenty three Ministers, with Myron Charles Taylor conspicuously in last place. "Nuncios" and "Ambassadors" were only exchanged between the Holy See and countries where the pope's representative ex officio was granted the title of dean of the diplomatic corps. In other countries, Pius XII was represented by an apostolic delegate or a chargé d'affaires, constituting a lower level of diplomatic recognition (representing the ecclesiastical hierarchy of a country, not the government). An apostolic delegate was neither accredited to a host government, nor required their approval.

A special 1948 Christmas Eve midnight Mass for diplomats celebrated by Pius XII was attended by 300 diplomatic personnel. In February 1949, there were thirty-nine accredited members of the Vatican diplomatic corps. A New Year's Day 1951 audience with the "entire diplomatic corps" included thirty-six accredited representatives, including eighteen full ambassadors, sixteen ministers, and two chargés d'affaires (China and Finland).

Nuncios

Apostolic delegates

Apostolic visitor

chargé d'affaires

World War II

Some of Pius XII's nuncios in occupied Europe were forced to flee their nunciatures, including Clemente Micara in Belgium, internuncio Paolo Giobbe in The Netherlands, and Casimir Papée in Poland. The nuncio to Luxembourg was similarly "overrun by German troops". Micara and Giobbe eventually found their ways to Rome. The Yugoslav and Romanian ambassadors also ended up in Rome but were told in 1944 to be ready to return at a moment's notice. The Baltic nuncios in Estonia, Latvia, and Lithuania were forced out by Russian troops. Although the nuncios de jure retained their titles, their role was either terminated or de facto taken up by Cesare Orsenigo, the nuncio to Germany.

Thus, Pius XIi maintained only eight wartime nunciatures to European nations, in: France, Germany, Hungary, Italy, Portugal, Romania, Spain, and Switzerland. These were supplemented by apostolic delegates in Albania, Bulgaria, Great Britain, Turkey, and the United States. A chargé d'affaires was created during the war to represent the newly created Slovak Republic, and an apostolic visitor was sent to the Nazi puppet state of Croatia.

By June 15, 1940, there were no longer any Allied ambassadors residing in Italian territory (the norm for ambassadors to the Vatican): the Polish, French, and British ambassadors entered Vatican City proper; Nieuwenhuys initially declined Vatican protection on June 16 to flee to Switzerland along with the Belgian ambassador to Italy, but decided to stay on June 18. Italy was at war with France, Britain, South Africa, Canada, and New Zealand, and had severed diplomatic relations with Belgium, Norway, the Netherlands, and Poland; of those, only France, Britain, Belgium, and Poland had resident ambassadors at the Vatican.

The same protection was not extended to Niko Mirosevich, the Yugoslav Minister, when he was ousted by Italy in July 1941. However, the ambassadors in the city-state were joined by Harold H. Tittmann, Jr, who remained as chargé d'affaires after Taylor's departure, after he was required to move into Vatican City by Italy on December 13, 1941.

After the Allied occupation of Rome, the Allied ambassadors moved out of Vatican City and the Japanese, German, Hungarian, Romanian, and Slovak delegations moved into the city-state, escorted by US troops. High-ranking Nazi Ernst von Weizsäcker and Mussolini's son-in-law Galeazzo Ciano both became ambassadors to the Vatican in 1943; it was believed that von Weizsäcker's main job was to keep an eye on Ciano lest the pope assist Italy in negotiating a separate peace with the Allies.

The Holocaust
Morley's Vatican Diplomacy and the Jews during the Holocaust (KTAV, 1980) is a comprehensive country-by-country study of Vatican diplomacy, using primary sources from the nuncios themselves up to the Cardinal Secretary of State and Pius XII himself. Morley's study draws heavily on the ADSS vols. 1–9, supplemented by documents from the Centre de Documentation Juive Contemporaine (Paris), British Foreign Office, Public Records Office (London), Institute for Jewish Affairs (London), the Nuremberg Trials, the World Jewish Congress archives (New York), and Yad Vashem (Jerusalem). The central conclusion of Morley is as follows:
This study of the Vatican and Jewish sources has revealed little evidence that the nuncios manifested any consistent humanitarian concern about the sufferings of the Jews during the years 1939 to 1943. This research has indicated that the Vatican diplomats only rarely acted on behalf of the Jews as Jews, and this usually only for specific individuals. They sometimes had words of sympathy for the Jews, but little action followed from these words.
However, Morley does find a multitude of examples of Vatican diplomats protesting against the effects of racial laws on Jews who converted to Catholicism before and during the Holocaust, as well as numerous interventions on their behalf.

Pius defender William Doino, Jr., writes that critics find major flaws in Morley's work, such as that he blames Pius for not confronting the Nazis but then admits in other parts of the book that such confrontations did little good when they did occur; that he accuses the Vatican of being "too diplomatic" at times and too "acrimonious" at others; that he accuses Pius of failing to help unbaptized Jews but doesn't acknowledge when Pius did extend help to unbaptized Jews; and that generally he "dismisses a wealth of documentation and scholarship that contradicts his thesis," such as when he denigrates Pius's efforts to maintain diplomatic relations with Germany and fails to acknowledge that the Vatican's diplomatic status allowed Pius to keep in touch with the German resistance and pass vital information he received from Germany onto Allies.

After World War II

Pius XII allowed Ernst von Weizsäcker, the former Nazi ambassador, to remain in Rome as a "guest" after Nazi Germany ceased to exist and he lost his status as an ambassador. Similar status was accorded to former Vichy France ambassador Léon Bérard, even after Pius XII received Jacques Maritain as French ambassador in 1945. von Weizsäcker was given political asylum for a time, although the Allies wished to charge him with war crimes (he would eventually be convicted at Nuremberg).

Ken Harada, the Japanese ambassador, remained in the Vatican "on much the same basis", while the Holy See protested that it had not yet received "official notification" from Gen. Douglas MacArthur that it should sever relations. As he was no longer accredited to the Vatican, Harada was not allowed to participate in a New Year's Day 1946 event, although Pius XII granted him a separate audience a few days later. Harada was received in a final farewell audience on January 25, 1946, before being repatriated, following MacArthur's order discontinuing Japan's diplomatic service.

After World War II relations were strained or cut with several Communist Eastern European nations. For example, there was no Apostolic Nuncio to Poland between 1947 and 1989.

After the resignation of US presidential envoy Myron Charles Taylor in 1950, Truman struggled to replace Taylor. American Protestant leaders opposed the continuation of the mission (including Truman's own pastor, Edward Pruden), and the Vatican wanted a full ambassador, not another "personal envoy". The appointment of General Mark Wayne Clark as United States Ambassador to the Holy See was withdrawn after a prolonged Senate fight. Clark had been the Allied Commander in Italy, known for the bombing of the historic abbey of Monte Cassino but also his triumphant entry into Rome in 1944.

Primary sources

As of 2002, no complete set of diplomatic papers has been published by any country with diplomatic relations with the Holy See during Pius XII's pontificate, although partial sets have been published in various works. However, the outrage over Rolf Hochhuth's 1963 play The Deputy prompted Pope Paul VI in 1964 to authorize the opening of Pius XII's diplomatic papers prior to the usual seventy-five year rule. Four Jesuit Priests were allowed into the archives and eleven volumes, Actes et documents du Saint Siège relatifs à la Seconde Guerre Mondiale (ADSS), were published between 1965 and 1981, covering only the wartime years.

Several diplomats at the Vatican wrote memoirs covering the period of Pius XII's pontificate, including the Free French ambassadors François Charles-Roux and Wladimir d'Ormesson and Polish ambassador Casimir Papée. Others have had their wartime papers published, including German ambassador Ernst von Weizsäcker and British Minister D'Arcy Osborne. Osborne's papers formed the basis of Owen Chadwick's Britain and the Vatican during the Second World War (1988). Wartime Correspondence Between President Roosevelt and Pope Pius XII was published in 2005 with a foreword and notes by Myron Charles Taylor.

The post-war papers of Aloisius Joseph Muench were also extensively preserved, and indexed at the Catholic University of America since 1976. The documents are the subject of a 2006 monograph by Dr. Suzanne Brown-Fleming, a fellow at the United States Holocaust Memorial Museum's Center for Advanced Holocaust Studies.

Footnotes

Notes

References
Blet, Pierre, and Johnson, Lawrence J. 1999. Pius XII and the Second World War: According to the Archives of the Vatican. Paulist Press. . 
Brown-Fleming, Suzanne. 2006. The Holocaust and Catholic Conscience: Cardinal Aloisius Muench and the Guilt Question in Germany. University of Notre Dame Press. .
Chadwick, Owen. 1988. Britain and the Vatican During the Second World War. Cambridge University Press. 
Morley, John. 1980. Vatican diplomacy and the Jews during the Holocaust, 1939-1943. New York : KTAV Pub. House. .
Sánchez, José M. 2002. Pius XII and the Holocaust: Understanding the Controversy. Washington D.C.: Catholic University of America Press.

External links
Papal Nuncios of 1933-1945: Ambassadors of the Vatican in the Shoah at Shoah Rose